Sinan Karweina (born 29 March 1999) is a German professional footballer who plays as a forward for Austrian Bundesliga club Austria Klagenfurt.

Career
In June 2019, MSV Duisburg, newly relegated to the 3. Liga, announced the signing of Karweina on a two-year contract. Afterwards, he joined Türkgücü München for the 2021–22 season.

On 8 July 2022, Karweina signed a two-year contract with Austrian Bundesliga club Austria Klagenfurt, after his former club Türkgücü München had been relegated after filing for insolvency.

Personal life
Born in Germany, Karweina is of Turkish descent and holds dual German-Turkish citizenship.

Career statistics

References

External links

1999 births
Living people
People from Gummersbach
Sportspeople from Cologne (region)
Footballers from North Rhine-Westphalia
German footballers
German expatriate footballers
Turkish footballers
German people of Turkish descent
Association football forwards
1. FC Köln II players
Sportfreunde Lotte players
MSV Duisburg players
Türkgücü München players
SK Austria Klagenfurt players
3. Liga players
Regionalliga players
Austrian Football Bundesliga players
Expatriate footballers in Austria
German expatriate sportspeople in Austria